The Namibia Statistics Agency (NSA), formerly the Central Bureau of Statistics (CBS), is the national statistical authority of Namibia, which is located in the capital Windhoek.

History
Before Namibian Independence in 1990, there was no stand-alone statistical authority. Statistical data was managed through a department of the South African Statistical Services. After independence, the Central Statistical Office was launched as a division of the National Planning Commission. It was later renamed the Central Bureau of Statistics.

In 2011, the Namibia Statistics Agency was formalised on the basis of the Statistics Act, 20 (Act No 9 of 2011) after it had already existed for several years. It reports to the National Planning Commission (NPC).

Legal Basis 
The statistical authority until 2011 operated on the basis of the Statistics Act, No 66 of 1976. A new Statistics Bill was discussed by the national assembly during 2010 to 2011, including the formation of an entirely independent Namibia Statistics Agency. With the endorsement of the Statistics Act, 2011 (Act No 9 of 2011) this was implemented.

Mandate and Organisation
The main responsibility of NSA are the preparation, publication and dissemination of objective, relevant, comparable, trustworthy, timely and easy to access official statistics in all areas of national interest. In addition, NSA coordinates the creation of official datasets, ensuring compliance with defined quality criteria.

NSA is headed by the Statistician General, currently Alex Shimuafeni.

Statistical Information 
The NSA regularly publishes various statistical datasets and publications.

Economic Data 
In the area of economics, NSA mainly publishes information on agriculture, consumer prices, foreign trade and macroeconomic data.
 National Accounts: quarterly publications as well as summaries spanning across several years (example 2000–2009)
 Annual Agricultural Survey and industrial statistics
 Consumer Price Index (NCPI) and inflation: monthly publication since February 2005, following the Interim Consumer Price Index for Windhoek that existed since January 1993
 Foreign Trade: quarterly publications

Demographic and Geospatial Data 
This department deals with the social structure of Namibia.
 Demography
 Social sciences
 Geographic Information Systems and Cartography

The main surveys include the Namibia Household Income and Expenditure Survey (NHIES) as well as the Namibia Inter-censal Demographic Survey (NIDS) conducted every five years, as well as the National Household Census conducted once in ten years. The first Geographic Information System created under the National Spatial Data Infrastructure (NSDI) policy, is the Bush Information System that provides a national dataset on bush encroachment.

External links 
 Official website of Namibia Statistics Agency
 Central Bureau of Statistics, website of the National Planning Commission

References 

Government of Namibia
National statistical services
Government agencies established in 2011
2011 establishments in Namibia